Max Rosenn (February 4, 1910 – February 7, 2006) was a United States circuit judge of the United States Court of Appeals for the Third Circuit.

Education and career

Born to a Jewish family in Plains, Pennsylvania, Rosenn received a Bachelor of Arts degree from Cornell University in 1929 and a Bachelor of Laws from the University of Pennsylvania Law School in 1932. Upon completing law school, Rosenn entered private practice in Wilkes-Barre, Pennsylvania. Rosenn was an assistant district attorney in Wilkes-Barre from 1941 to 1944, and a First Lieutenant in the United States Army during World War II from 1944 to 1946 (in the JAG Corps in the Philippines). In 1954, Rosenn, Mitchell Jenkins and Henry Greenwald founded the Wilkes-Barre law firm of Rosenn, Jenkins & Greenwald, which has grown to become a 40-member regional law firm with offices in Wilkes-Barre and Hazleton, Pennsylvania. He was a Fellow of the American College of Trial Lawyers. He was the Pennsylvania Secretary of Public Welfare 1966 to 1967. In 1972, when Wilkes-Barre and the entire Wyoming Valley area was devastated by a flood, he chaired the Flood Recovery Task Force.

Federal judicial service

On September 3, 1970, Rosenn was nominated by President Richard Nixon to a seat on the United States Court of Appeals for the Third Circuit vacated by Judge David Henry Stahl. Rosenn was confirmed by the United States Senate on October 6, 1970, and received his commission the following day. Rosenn assumed senior status on January 21, 1981, serving in that capacity until his death.

Honors

In 1980, to commemorate Rosenn's tenth anniversary on the bench, his former law clerks established the annual Max Rosenn Lecture Series in Law and Humanities at Wilkes College (now Wilkes University) in Wilkes-Barre. Following his death, they formed the Association of Law Clerks of The Honorable Max Rosenn. The Max Rosenn United States Courthouse in Wilkes-Barre is named for him, as is the Max Rosenn Memorial Law Library in the Luzerne County Courthouse.

Personal

Rosenn was married to Tillie Hershkowitz, who died in 1992. Rosenn died in Wilkes-Barre on February 7, 2006, at the age of 96. They had two sons.

See also
List of Jewish American jurists

References

Sources
 

1910 births
2006 deaths
20th-century American Jews
Cornell University alumni
United States Army officers
Judges of the United States Court of Appeals for the Third Circuit
United States court of appeals judges appointed by Richard Nixon
20th-century American judges
University of Pennsylvania Law School alumni
Military personnel from Pennsylvania
21st-century American Jews
Politicians from Wilkes-Barre, Pennsylvania
Politicians from Luzerne County, Pennsylvania